Ron McKenzie (born 29 November 1930) is a former Australian rules footballer who played with Collingwood and Melbourne in the Victorian Football League (VFL).

Notes

External links 

1930 births
Australian rules footballers from Victoria (Australia)
Collingwood Football Club players
Melbourne Football Club players
Ivanhoe Amateurs Football Club players
Living people